Subrata Saha (5 December 1953 – 29 December 2022) was an Indian politician who served as Minister without portfolio and as Minister of State for Public Works in the Government of West Bengal. He was also a MLA, elected from the Sagardighi constituency in the 2011 West Bengal state assembly election.

Subrata Saha was divested of his portfolio and retained as minister without portfolio in May 2014.

Saha was a law graduate and a businessman. He died from complications from gallbladder surgery on 29 December 2022, at the age of 69.

References 

1953 births
2022 deaths
State cabinet ministers of West Bengal
West Bengal MLAs 2011–2016
Trinamool Congress politicians from West Bengal
West Bengal MLAs 2016–2021
People from Murshidabad district